The Nekromantix is a Danish-American psychobilly band founded in Copenhagen in 1989. Their lyrics are generally structured around monster and horror themes. A central icon of the band's image is founder and frontman Kim Nekroman's "coffinbass", a custom-built double bass with a body in the shape of a coffin and a headstock the shape of a cross. Nekroman has been the sole constant member of the band. The current lineup consists of guitarist Francisco Mesa and drummer Rene "Delamuerte" Garcia, known as a guitarist and singer of the Canadian band "The Brains".

The Nekromantix released five albums on various European record labels during their first decade, then crossed over to American audiences in the early 2000s by signing to Los Angeles-based Hellcat Records, through which they have released three albums since 2002. Their eighth studio album, What Happens in Hell, Stays in Hell, was released in August 2011.

History

Formation 
The Nekromantix were formed in 1989 in Copenhagen by Kim Nekroman after he left the Danish Navy, in which he had been a submarine radio operator for eight years. Deciding to launch a new career in music, he initially played drums in a rockabilly band prior to the foundation of Nekromantix.

Learning to play the double bass and to sing, Nekroman set about forming a horror-themed psychobilly band with himself as the frontman. Initially consisting of Nekroman, guitarist Paolo Molinari and drummer Jens Brygman, the band took the name Nekromantix.

A centerpiece of the band's image was Nekroman's self-constructed "coffinbass", an upright bass in the shape of a coffin. The first of these was constructed using an actual child-sized coffin, but over the years he has constructed new models in order to achieve better acoustics and collapsibility for easier transportation. By the time of the band's first official recordings, Molinari and Brygman had been replaced respectively by Peter Sandorff and Sebastian Jensen, who used the pseudonym Peek.

After six months of practice and two local performances in Copenhagen at the Stengade 30 club, the Nekromantix appeared at large psychobilly festival in Hamburg, Germany. Their performance earned them a recording contract with Tombstone Records for their first album Hellbound. The band began touring Europe and built a name for themselves in the European psychobilly movement, which at the time was largely dominated by British acts. In 1991 the band released their second album Curse of the Coffin through Nervous Records and supported it with a music video for the title track which received some play on the MTV program Alternative Nation.

Lineup changes 
In 1992 both Peek and Sandorff left the band. They were replaced by guitarist Jan Daggry and drummer Tim Kristensen, who used the stage names Ian Dawn ("Dawn" being an English translation of the Danish name Daggry) and Grim Tim Handsome. This lineup recorded the album Brought Back to Life, released in 1994, which earned a Grammy Award nomination for "Best Heavy Metal Album".

Daggry then left the band and was replaced on tour first by Emil Oelund and then by Tormod Holm, until the band found new permanent guitarist Søren Munk Petersen. The Nekroman/Petersen/Kristensen lineup recorded 1996's Demons Are a Girl's Best Friend. During this time the band toured most of Europe including Finland, Germany, the UK, the Netherlands, Belgium, Sweden and France, and also toured Japan. They began to achieve cult status in the United States, where their albums were as yet only available as imports.

At a 1996 festival in Cologne, Germany, Nekroman met fellow Copenhagen native Patricia Day, with whom he launched a new band called HorrorPops with himself on guitar and Day on double bass and lead vocals. The two would later marry, and their activity with HorrorPops put the Nekromantix on hold for several years, during which time Kristensen and Petersen both left the band.

International success 
In 1997 Peter Sandorff returned to Nekromantix, bringing along his brother, Kristian, to play drums. In 1999 the band played a tenth-anniversary performance at Stengade 30 in Copenhagen, where they had performed their first shows after forming the band. This performance was recorded by Danish National Radio for a series of live shows and released the following year as the live album Undead 'n' Live. In 2000 the Nekromantix played their first performances in the United States, beginning with the first annual New York City "Psychobilly Rumble" and continuing with a nine-date tour of the west coast.

In February 2001 Nekroman gave a demo of new songs to Rancid singer/guitarist and Hellcat Records label owner Tim Armstrong, a longtime fan of the band. The Nekromantix soon signed to the Los Angeles-based Hellcat and released the 2002 album Return of the Loving Dead. Recorded in Denmark, it was the band's first album to be widely distributed in the U.S. and helped make them part of an emerging psychobilly movement on the west coast centered around the Hellcat label and spearheaded by bands such as Tiger Army. The album was supported with a music video for the song "Gargoyles Over Copenhagen" and the band toured the United States several times.

Move to the United States 

Following the release of Return of the Loving Dead Nekroman relocated to Los Angeles, touring and recording two albums with the HorrorPops. The Sandorff brothers remained in Denmark, and recording of the Nekromantix' 2004 album Dead Girls Don't Cry was done almost entirely in Los Angeles, with only Peter Sandorff's backing vocals recorded in Copenhagen. In April 2005 the Sandorffs left the band leaving only Nekroman in band. To replace them Nekroman recruited guitarist Troy Russel (Tröy Deströy) and drummer James Mesa (Wasted James) of the California-based psychobilly band the Rezurex. That year the band's third album Brought Back to Life was remastered and re-released by Hellcat under the title Brought Back to Life Again.

Recent activity 
In May 2006 Meza left the Nekromantix, later joining Tiger Army. He was replaced by Andrew Martinez (Andy DeMize) of The Rocketz. Life Is a Grave & I Dig It! was released in April 2007. In November 2007 the band announced Tröy Deströy's departure to focus on a solo career. Pete Belair of the Australian band Firebird was announced as the band's new guitarist and performed with them during their 2008 tours, living in Australia complicated things and Francisco Mesa, formerly of Barcelona-based Nightbreed and Ultimo Asalto, joined as a permanent guitarist.

On 11 January 2009, Martinez was killed in an automobile collision. The following month it was announced that Lux, formerly of Mystery Hangup and Sacred Storm, would be Martinez's replacement. The band's first female member, Lux stated that the Nekromantix would tour North America with Reverend Horton Heat during the summer and record a new album later in the year. The band's eighth studio album, What Happens in Hell, Stays in Hell, was released 2 August 2011. The band will support the album with a tour of the United States from July to September 2011. In April 2014, it was announced that Lux would depart from the band. It was later announced in June 2014 that Adam Guerrero, formerly of Rezurex, would replace Lux as the new Nekromantix drummer. In October 2017, Guerrero departed from the band and Lux returned to fill in for a few shows. In April 2018 it was announced that Rene "Delamuerte" Garcia, from The Brains and BAT! would be the new Nekromantix drummer.

Band members

Current members 
Kim Nekroman – "coffinbass", lead vocals (1989–present)
Francisco Mesa – guitars, backing vocals (2008–present)
Rene "Dlamuerte" Garcia – drums (2018–present)

Past members 
Paolo Molinari – guitars (1989)
Jens Brygman – drums (1989)
Peek (Sebastian Jensen) – drums (1989–1993)
Peter Sandorff – guitars, backing vocals (1989–1993, 1997–2005)
Ian Dawn (Jan Daggry) – guitars, backing vocals (1993–1994)
Emil Oelund – guitars (1994–1995)
Tormod Holm – guitars (1995)
Søren Munk Petersen – guitars, backing vocals (1995–1996)
Grim Tim Handsome (Tim Kristensen) – drums (1993–1996)
Kristian Sandorff – drums (1997–2005)
Wasted James (James Meza) – drums (2005–2006)
Tröy Deströy – guitars, backing vocals (2005–2007)
Pete Belair – guitars, backing vocals (2007–2008)
Andy DeMize (Andrew Martinez) – drums (2006–2009)
Lux – drums (2009–2014)
Adam "Mighty Mouse" Guerrero – drums (2014–2017)

Timeline

Discography 

The discography of the Nekromantix consists of eight studio albums, two live album, three singles and three music videos.

Studio albums

Live albums

Singles

Music videos

See also 
List of psychobilly bands

References

External links 

 Nekromantix at Hellcat Records

Danish punk rock groups
Psychobilly groups
Hellcat Records artists
Danish musical trios
Musical groups established in 1989